Enochian is an occult or angelic language recorded in the private journals of Dr. John Dee and his seer Edward Kelley in the late 16th century.

Enochian may also refer to:
 Enochian chess, a four-player chess variant
 Enochian magic, a system of ceremonial magic based on the writings of John Dee and Edward Kelley
 Enochian Theory, a British rock band

See also 
 Enoch (disambiguation)